This is an article about the former outdoor team. For the original indoor team, see Sacramento Knights.

Sacramento Knights was an American soccer team based in Folsom, California, United States. Founded in 2003, the team played in the National Premier Soccer League (NPSL), a national amateur league at the fourth tier of the American Soccer Pyramid, until 2008, when the franchise folded and the team left the league. It has been announced that the team will play its 2009 season at Folsom High School as part of the United Soccer League.

The team played its home games in the stadium at Cosumnes River College, and will play its 2009 season at Folsom High School. The team's colors are maroon, navy blue, gold and white.

The team had spent the 2008 season on hiatus while the club's finances and infrastructure are reorganised, but did not return to full competition in 2009.

History

Players

2007 roster

Year-by-year

Honors
 NPSL Champions 2006
 NPSL Northwest Division Champions 2006
 NPSL West Division Champions 2005

Head coaches
  Ron Preble (2003–2007)
   Chris Hawken (Vice President Operations 2003–2005 & Interim Co-Head Coach 2005)

Stadia
 Stadium at Cosumnes River College; Sacramento, California (2003–2007)
 Stadium at Folsom High School; Folsom, California (2009–present)

External links
Sacramento Knights

National Premier Soccer League teams
K
Defunct soccer clubs in California
2003 establishments in California
2009 disestablishments in California
Association football clubs disestablished in 2009
Association football clubs established in 2003
Folsom, California